Katherine K. Wallman is an American statistician who was the Chief Statistician of the United States from 1992 to 2017. In that role at the U.S. Office of Management and Budget, she provided coordination, guidance, and oversight for the Federal Statistical System of the United States. 

In 1983 Wallman was elected as a Fellow of the American Statistical Association.
She was the president of the American Statistical Association in 1992, and Chairwoman of the United Nations Statistical Commission in 2004-5. She has made several appearances on C-SPAN.

Wallman organized efforts to pass and implement the 2002 CIPSEA law which standardized confidentiality-protection and information-sharing by U.S. federal government statistical agencies.

Works

See also 
List of presidents of the American Statistical Association

References

External links 

American statisticians
Women statisticians
Fellows of the American Statistical Association
Presidents of the American Statistical Association
Year of birth missing (living people)
Living people